Marco Belotti (born 29 November 1988 in Brescia) is an Italian freestyle swimmer. He competed at the 2008, 2012 and 2016 Summer Olympics. At the 2008 Summer Olympics, he competed in the 4 x 100 m and 4 x 200 m freestyle relays. In 2012, he competed in the men's individual 200 m freestyle and the 4 x 200 m freestyle, and, in 2016, he competed in the 4 x 200 m freestyle relay only.

References

1988 births
Living people
Italian male swimmers
Olympic swimmers of Italy
Swimmers at the 2008 Summer Olympics
Swimmers at the 2012 Summer Olympics
Swimmers at the 2016 Summer Olympics
Universiade medalists in swimming
University of Teramo alumni

Sportspeople from Brescia
Mediterranean Games gold medalists for Italy
Mediterranean Games medalists in swimming
Swimmers at the 2009 Mediterranean Games
Universiade bronze medalists for Italy
Medalists at the 2015 Summer Universiade
21st-century Italian people